Lars Olof Karlsson (born June 28, 1960) is an ice hockey player who played for the Swedish national team. He won a bronze medal at the 1988 Winter Olympics. He played for IF Björklöven and for Leksands IF.

Career statistics

Regular season and playoffs

International

References 

1960 births
Living people
Ice hockey players at the 1988 Winter Olympics
Olympic bronze medalists for Sweden
Olympic ice hockey players of Sweden
Olympic medalists in ice hockey
Leksands IF players
IF Björklöven players
Medalists at the 1988 Winter Olympics